Metanarsia scythiella is a moth of the family Gelechiidae. It is found in Russia (Tuva, Ubsa-Noor Lake). The habitat consists of arid areas.

The length of the forewings is about 11.5 mm. The forewings are bright yellow and the cotal margin and termen are reddish-pink. The hindwings are grey.

References

Moths described in 2000
Metanarsia